YZ Cassiopeiae (21 Cas) is a star system  away from Earth, in the constellation Cassiopeia. It comprises three stars: an eclipsing Algol-type binary and a visually fainter star about 3000 AU distant.

The primary star in the YZ Cassiopeiae system is a white subgiant (main sequence) star of spectral type A1Vm and 2.31 solar masses with a less massive main sequence dwarf star of type F2V and 1.35 . The apparent magnitude of the eclipsing binary varies from 5.65 to 6.05 with a period of 4.4672 days. Combined, they appear to have a spectral type of A2IV.

The binary has a dimmer (magnitude 9.7 according to Norton, or 10.5 by SIMBAD) companion of 0.8  orbiting with a period of about 86 580 years.

References

Triple star systems
Eclipsing binaries
Cassiopeia (constellation)
A-type subgiants
F-type main-sequence stars
Cassiopeiae, 21
Cassiopeiae, YZ
BD+74 0027
004161
003572
0192